Orsk is the second largest city in Orenburg Oblast, Russia, located on the steppe about  southeast of the southern tip of the Ural Mountains. The city straddles the Ural River. Population:  It lies adjacent to the Kazakhstan–Russia border.

Geography
The city is located where the Ural River turns from south to west and where the Or River comes in from the southeast (hence the name). It was part of the Orenburg Line of forts.

History
Orsk was founded (as Orenburg) in 1735 in the process of the Russian colonization of Bashkiria and the Southern Ural region. The first settlement was founded by an expedition headed by Ivan Kirilov as a military fortification at the Mount Preobrazhenskaya on the left bank of the Yaik River (presently Ural River). Originally called Orenburg, its name was changed to Orsk in 1739. At its foundation it marked a southeastern projection of European Russia toward the steppes of Central Asia. It housed an exchange post and Russian customs that dealt with traders from Kazakhstan and Asia.

From June 22, 1847 to May 11, 1848, the fortress of Orsk was home of the exiled Ukrainian poet and painter Taras Shevchenko. In 1861, the fortress was decommissioned and became a station of the Orenburg Cossack army. In 1865, Orsk was granted the city status and became the uyezd center in Orenburg Governorate.

The city grew dramatically starting from the 1870s. The population was mainly occupied with trade in cattle and grain, reprocessing of agricultural products, and various arts and crafts. Many women were involved in the business of weaving famous Orenburg shawls. By 1913, the population of Orsk was over 21,000, and by 1917 there were eleven churches and minarets, and sixteen educational facilities of various types and levels. During the Russian Civil War, from 1918 to 1919, Orsk withstood a three-month-long blockade and then four times changed hands between warring sides.

In the 1930s, the construction of large industrial enterprises, which drew their resources from the mineral rich soils of the region, started. One of the most notable stones excavated within the Orsk city line in the Mount Polkovnik is jasper. Orsk jasper is revered for its variety of natural designs and colors. All colors except for blue are represented in this stone.

Administrative and municipal status
Within the framework of administrative divisions, it is, together with eight rural localities, incorporated as the City of Orsk—an administrative unit with the status equal to that of the districts. As a municipal division, the City of Orsk is incorporated as Orsk Urban Okrug.

Economy
Orsk is the most important industrial center of Orenburg Oblast. The main industries are metallurgy, machine building, petroleum chemistry, food and light industries. The most important enterprises are Yuzhuralnikel, Orsknefteorgsintez, and Yuzhuralmashzavod. Following the dissolution of the Soviet Union, chronic under-investment, sanctions and lack of reforms led to the loss of 50,000 jobs and 30 plants, Forbes.com reported.

Transportation

The city is served by Orsk Airport and there is an eponymously named former Russian Air Force base located northeast of the city.

Education and culture
A branch of Orenburg State Institute of Management (OSIM) operates in the city. Other than that, there is one major institute in Orsk: Orsk' humanitary-technological institute. There are also a number of different schools and colleges, State Drama Theater, Museum of Local History, Laboratory of Archeological Studies, Children's Art Gallery, Children's Folk Theater "Blue Bird" and a municipal brass band.

Some of the peculiar landmarks of industrial Orsk are forty archeological monuments including ancient settlements, mass and single grave sites. Those that have been excavated became famous in the scientific world. For instance, grave sites in Kumak, that date back to the Bronze Age provide convincing evidence to the hypothesis of Eastern European roots of Indo-European peoples.

In the grave sites that date back to the early Iron Age (7th–6th centuries BCE) left by "savromatian" or "sormatian" tribes scientists found many ancient items including a clay vessel bearing the name of the Persian ruler Artaxerxes I, the sixth such vessel found in the world.

References

Notes

Sources

External links

Official website of Orsk 
Orsk Business Directory Orsk.jsprav.ru 
Information portal of Orenburg Oblast. History of Orsk 

Cities and towns in Orenburg Oblast
Orsky Uyezd
Populated places established in 1735